Pelcher Pond is located west of Raquette Lake, New York. The outlet creek flows into Shallow Lake. Fish species present in the pond are brook trout and sunfish. There is access by trail from Shallow Lake. No motors are allowed on the pond.

References

Lakes of New York (state)
Lakes of Hamilton County, New York